In its -year history, the Baltimore Orioles baseball franchise of Major League Baseball's American League has employed 42 managers. The duties of the team manager include team strategy and leadership on and off the field. Of those 42 managers, 12 have been "player-managers"; specifically, they managed the team while still being signed as a player. Since 1992, the team has played its home games at Oriole Park at Camden Yards.

The Baltimore franchise began operations in Milwaukee, Wisconsin, as the Brewers (not to be confused with the current National League team of the same name) in 1901. After one season in Wisconsin under manager and Hall of Famer Hugh Duffy, the franchise moved south to St. Louis, Missouri, adopting the St. Louis Browns name and hiring a new manager, Jimmy McAleer. The Browns remained in Missouri until the end of the 1953 season, when Major League Baseball's owners elected to move the franchise to Baltimore, Maryland, where they were renamed the Orioles, after Maryland's state bird.

Seven managers have taken the Orioles franchise to the post-season; Earl Weaver led the Orioles to a team-record six playoff appearances. Weaver, Hank Bauer, and Joe Altobelli are the only managers who have won a World Series championship with the club: Bauer in the 1966 World Series, over the Los Angeles Dodgers; Weaver in the 1970 World Series, over the Cincinnati Reds; and Altobelli in the 1983 World Series, over the Philadelphia Phillies. Weaver is the longest-tenured manager in franchise history, with 2,541 games of service in parts of 17 seasons (1968–1982, 1985–1986). The manager with the highest winning percentage in his career with the franchise is Luman Harris, owner of a .630 winning percentage during his 27 games managed in 1961; conversely, the worst winning percentage in franchise history is .222 by Oscar Melillo, who posted a 2–7 record during the 1938 season. Eight Orioles managers have been elected to the National Baseball Hall of Fame, including Frank Robinson, who was the first African-American manager in Major League Baseball; and Rogers Hornsby, who was a member of the cross-city rival Cardinals during the franchise's tenure in St. Louis.

Table key

Managers

Footnotes
 A running total of the number of Brewers'/Browns'/Orioles' managers. Thus, any manager who has two or more separate terms is only counted once.

References

External links
Baltimore Orioles Official Website

Managers
 
Baltimore Orioles